Nagyecsed is a town in Szabolcs-Szatmár-Bereg county, in the Northern Great Plain region of eastern Hungary.

The old name of the town was Ecsed but over time it has been renamed Nagyecsed, meaning "grand" or "great Ecsed" to distinguish it. The area had close associations with a cadet branch of the Báthory family. Elizabeth Báthory was raised in the town's now ruined castle. Her main residence and later her prison was Csejte Castle, Upper Hungary, now in Slovakia, but she was buried in the family crypt at Ecsed.

The town's castle was demolished in the eighteenth century after the Kuruc uprisings.

Geography 

The town is divided in two by the Crasna River. It formerly lay north west of the Ecsed Marsh (Ecsedi-láp), which was the largest contiguous marshland of the Great Hungarian Plain. As part of water control operations by Tibor Károlyi this was drained in the late nineteenth century, and the lands thus reclaimed transformed into farmland.

Notable people 
 

Bódi Guszti (born 1958), a Lovari Romani, Gypsy, Hungarian musician, composer and singer

References 

Populated places in Szabolcs-Szatmár-Bereg County
Elizabeth Báthory